Laurie Jussaume (born 7 September 1999) is a Canadian cyclist.

Jussaume won a bronze medal at the 2017–18 UCI Track Cycling World Cup and represented Canada in the junior events at the UCI Road World Championships in 2016 and 2017.

She competed at the 2018 Pan American Track Cycling Championships, where she won a bronze medal in the team pursuit, and at the 2019 Pan American Games, where she won a silver medal in the women's team pursuit event and a bronze medal in the women's time trial event.

References

External links 
 

1999 births
Living people
Canadian female cyclists
Cyclists at the 2019 Pan American Games
Pan American Games medalists in cycling
Pan American Games silver medalists for Canada
Pan American Games bronze medalists for Canada
Medalists at the 2019 Pan American Games
20th-century Canadian women
21st-century Canadian women